Becerril is a Spanish surname. Notable people with the surname include:

Mario Becerril (1917–2018), Mexican equestrian
Porfirio Becerril (born 1955), Mexican diver
Soledad Becerril (born 1944), Spanish politician

Spanish-language surnames